Pilsen is an unincorporated community in Marion County, Kansas, United States.  It is named after the city Plzeň (German: Pilsen) in Czech Republic, formerly Bohemia.  As of the 2020 census, the population of the community and nearby areas was 65.  It is located north of Marion and west of Lincolnville at the intersection of Remington Road and 275th Street.

History

Early history

For many millennia, the Great Plains of North America was inhabited by nomadic Native Americans.  From the 16th century to 18th century, the Kingdom of France claimed ownership of large parts of North America.  In 1762, after the French and Indian War, France secretly ceded New France to Spain, per the Treaty of Fontainebleau.

19th century
In 1802, Spain returned most of the land to France.  In 1803, most of the land for modern day Kansas was acquired by the United States from France as part of the 828,000 square mile Louisiana Purchase for 2.83 cents per acre.

In 1854, the Kansas Territory was organized, then in 1861 Kansas became the 34th U.S. state.  In 1855, Marion County was established within the Kansas Territory, which included the land for modern day Pilsen.

Pilsen was founded in 1874 and named to honor the city of Plzeň of Bohemia by Bohemian immigrants. The area was settled in the 1870s and 1880s by 46 Bohemian families of Czech and German descent who purchased their land from the Atchison, Topeka and Santa Fe Railway.

In 1888, the first Catholic church was built. It was a two-story frame building; the upper floor was the church and the lower floor was the rectory. The building was converted into a convent after the second church was built.

20th century

After the General Store closed in 1902, Mr and Mrs Cerny built a new two-story store at the current Pilsen site, and continued to operate it until 1944, then later it was torn down in 1970.

The current St. John Nepomucene Catholic church as built in 1914–1915.  Train carloads of brick were ordered from Kansas City then delivered to the closest station in Lincolnville.  The pile of bricks in Pilsen was so large that people often joked "how many churches are you going to build?"  The church cost approximately $30,000, but the cost would have been higher if it had not been for the local volunteer labor.  In 1924, an eleven-room rectory was built.  In the early 1940s, Emil Kapaun was pastor at the church and assisted Father Sklenar.

A post office existed in Pilsen from March 17, 1917 to March 8, 1957.

21st century
On June 3, 2001, volunteers dedicated a statue honoring Chaplain Emil Kapaun at St. John Nepomucene Church.

In 2010, the Keystone-Cushing Pipeline (Phase II) was constructed near Pilsen, north to south through Marion County, with much controversy over road damage, tax exemption, and environmental concerns (if a leak ever occurs).

Geography
Pilsen is located at coordinates 38.4714024, -97.0402972 in the scenic Flint Hills and Great Plains of the state of Kansas.

Demographics

For statistical purposes, the United States Census Bureau has defined Pilsen as a census-designated place (CDP), which includes population from the surrounding area.

Area events
 Father Kapaun Day on first Sunday in June
 Military Pilgrimage in November

Area attractions
 St John Nepomucene Catholic Church.  The highlight of the small community of Pilsen is St John Nepomucene Catholic Church.  The cornerstone was laid in 1914 by Father John Sklenar, the first parish priest.  The church can be seen for miles around the flat farming community of Pilsen. The church itself is 120 feet tall, topped by a silver-colored neo-Gothic dome.  St John Nepomucene, for whom the church was named is the patron saint of Bohemia and Christian martyr of the 14th Century.

Education
The community is served by Centre USD 397 public school district.  The high school is a member of T.E.E.N., a shared video teaching network between five area high schools.
 Centre School; 2374 310th St, Lost Springs, KS; between Lost Springs and Lincolnville, east of U.S. 77 highway.

Media

Print
 Marion County Record, official county newspaper and city newspaper for Marion.
 Hillsboro Free Press, free newspaper for greater Marion County area.

Infrastructure

Transportation

Utilities
 Internet
 Satellite is provided by HughesNet, StarBand, WildBlue.
 TV
 Satellite is provided by DirecTV, Dish Network.
 Terrestrial is provided by regional digital TV stations.
 Electricity
 Community and Rural areas provided by Flint Hills RECA.

Notable people
 Emil Kapaun, (1916–1951), Roman Catholic priest, United States Army chaplain, candidate for sainthood and recipient of the Medal of Honor.

References

Further reading

 Early Pilsen Community History; Jane C. Rupp; Marion Record; September 16, 1937.

External links

Community
 Community of Pilsen, archive of former website
 St. John Nepomucene Catholic Church and Emil Kapaun museum
Historical
 Marion County cemetery list, archive of KsGenWeb
 Marion County history bibliography,  Marion County school bibliography, Kansas Historical Society
Maps
 Marion County maps: Current, Historic, KDOT
 Topo Map of Eastshore and Pilsen area, USGS

Czech-American culture in Kansas
Unincorporated communities in Kansas
Unincorporated communities in Marion County, Kansas
Populated places established in 1874
1874 establishments in Kansas